Troy is a city in and the county seat of Doniphan County, Kansas, United States.  As of the 2020 census, the population of the city was 964.

History
Troy was platted in 1855. It was named after the ancient city of Troy. The first house in Troy was built in 1856, and the first store opened in 1857. Troy was incorporated as a city in 1860. The first post office in Troy was established in March, 1857.

Troy grew up from humble beginnings along the wagon route from St. Joseph, Missouri to Oregon and California.  British explorer Richard Francis Burton en route to California in 1860 noted: "Passing through a few wretched shanties called Troy ..."

Geography
Troy is located at  (39.788099, -95.090840).

Climate

Demographics

Troy is part of the St. Joseph, MO–KS Metropolitan Statistical Area.

2010 census
As of the census of 2010, there were 1,010 people, 421 households, and 275 families residing in the city. The racial makeup of the city was 97.3% White, 0.5% African American, 0.2% Native American, 0.3% Asian, 0.2% from other races, and 1.5% from two or more races. Hispanic or Latino of any race were 2.7% of the population.

There were 421 households, of which 31.4% had children under the age of 18 living with them, 49.6% were married couples living together, 10.0% had a female householder with no husband present, 5.7% had a male householder with no wife present, and 34.7% were non-families. 30.9% of all households were made up of individuals, and 16.1% had someone living alone who was 65 years of age or older. The average household size was 2.38 and the average family size was 2.95.

The median age in the city was 39.1 years. 24.7% of residents were under the age of 18; 8.8% were between the ages of 18 and 24; 23.9% were from 25 to 44; 24.9% were from 45 to 64; and 17.3% were 65 years of age or older. The gender makeup of the city was 48.3% male and 51.7% female.

2000 census
As of the census of 2000, there were 1,054 people, 439 households, and 295 families residing in the city. The racial makeup of the city was 98.77% White, 0.28% African American, 0.28% Native American, 0.09% Asian, 0.09% from other races, and 0.47% from two or more races. Hispanic or Latino of any race were 1.04% of the population.

There were 439 households, out of which 31.4% had children under the age of 18 living with them, 54.0% were married couples living together, 8.9% had a female householder with no husband present, and 32.6% were non-families. 30.3% of all households were made up of individuals, and 18.7% had someone living alone who was 65 years of age or older. The average household size was 2.38 and the average family size was 2.96.

In the city, the population was spread out, with 26.2% under the age of 18, 7.4% from 18 to 24, 26.7% from 25 to 44, 20.3% from 45 to 64, and 19.4% who were 65 years of age or older. The median age was 38 years. For every 100 females, there were 98.1 males. For every 100 females age 18 and over, there were 93.5 males.

The median income for a household in the city was $31,786, and the median income for a family was $37,039. Males had a median income of $28,229 versus $19,706 for females. The per capita income for the city was $15,138. About 13.4% of families and 12.2% of the population were below the poverty line, including 16.2% of those under age 18 and 4.7% of those age 65 or over.

Education
The community is served by Troy USD 429 public school district.

Notable people
 Chloe Gartner, American novelist.
 Charles "Buffalo" Jones, American frontiersman, farmer, rancher, hunter, and conservationist who cofounded Garden City, Kansas.
 Charles Evans Whittaker, Associate Justice of the United States Supreme Court from 1957 to 1962

References

Further reading

External links

 City of Troy
 Troy - Directory of Public Officials
 Troy - Kansas Historical Marker, Kansas Heritage.org
 Troy city map, KDOT

Cities in Kansas
County seats in Kansas
Cities in Doniphan County, Kansas
St. Joseph, Missouri metropolitan area
1855 establishments in Kansas Territory